Marko Jakšić (born 10 August 1983) is a Serbian football striker.

Honours
Radnik Surdulica
Serbian First League: 2014–15

References

External links
 Marko Jakšić profile at Srbijafudbal
 Marko Jakšić stats at Utakmica.rs
 

1983 births
Living people
Footballers from Belgrade
Serbian footballers
FK Radnički Beograd players
FK Borac Čačak players
FK Rad players
FK Radnički Pirot players
FK Zemun players
FK BSK Borča players
FK Timok players
FK Bežanija players
FK Sloboda Užice players
FK Radnik Surdulica players
FK Drina Zvornik players
Serbian First League players
Serbian SuperLiga players
Association football forwards
MFK Ružomberok players
Slovak Super Liga players
Expatriate footballers in Slovakia
Expatriate footballers in Kuwait
Expatriate footballers in Finland
Serbian expatriate sportspeople in Slovakia
Serbian expatriate sportspeople in Kuwait
Serbian expatriate sportspeople in Finland
Al-Shabab SC (Kuwait) players